Viktor Gluck (1. September 1897 in Brno , Austria-Hungary) was a German cinematographer who worked on thirty three films between 1923 and 1934.

Selected filmography
 The Hell of Barballo (1923)
 Gulliver's Travels (1924)
 The Life of Beethoven (1927)
 Schweik in Civilian Life (1927)
 Robert and Bertram (1928)
 Marriage (1928)
 The Girl from the Provinces (1929)
 Marriage in Name Only (1930)
 The Other Side (1931)
 Durand Versus Durand (1931)
 Circus Life (1931)
 Student Life in Merry Springtime (1931)
 A Woman Branded (1931)
 Marshal Forwards (1932)
 Tannenberg (1932)

References

Bibliography
 Kester, Bernadette. Film Front Weimar: Representations of the First World War in German Films of the Weimar Period (1919-1933). Amsterdam University Press, 2003.

External links

Year of birth unknown
Year of death unknown
Austrian cinematographers
Film people from Brno
1897 births
1957 deaths
Jewish emigrants from Nazi Germany to the United Kingdom